Subedar Joginder Singh is a 2018 Indian Punjabi-language biographical war film based on the life of Joginder Singh, an Indian soldier who was killed in the 1962 Sino-Indian War and posthumously awarded the Param Vir Chakra. It is produced by Saga Music and is set to release by 6 April 2018. The film stars Gippy Grewal and Aditi Sharma and is directed by Simerjit Singh who belongs to the same region of Moga where Joginder Singh was born. This movie was a high budget film. The film is authentic to that in the era of 1962.

The movie was shot in Suratgarh or Rajasthan which is nearly 100 km from the Indo-Pakistan border, to give a look of the pre-independence village of Punjab. The additional shooting of the movie took place in October 2017 at the Dras sector in Jammu and Kashmir to give real life experience of the Tawang valley during the 1962 war.

Plot 
This movie is based upon the life, struggle and valor of a subedar in Indian Army who died while fighting the Chinese in the Sino-Indian War in 1962. This movie is believed to depict the subedar's professional and personal life and how he handled it while serving his nation.

Cast 
 Gippy Grewal as Subedar Joginder Singh
 Aditi Sharma as Gurdyal Kaur
 Nirmal Rishi as Joginder Singh's Mother  
 Guggu Gill as Maan Singh
 Loveleen Kaur Sasan as Bacchan kaur
 Kulwinder Billa as Ajaib Singh (Sipahi)
 Roshan Prince as Swaran Singh (Sipahi)
 Jaggi Singh as Santokh Singh (Naik)
 Jordan Sandhu as Bant Singh
 Raghveer Boli as Mahinder Singh
 Karamjit Anmol as Bawa Singh (Sipahi) 
 Rajvir Jawanda as Bahadur Singh (Sipahi)
 Harish Verma as Commander
 Parminder Gill as Mother in law
 Harpreet Singh as Sepoy
 Sharan Maan as Bhaag Singh (Sipahi)

Shooting locations

Suratgarh is a small town in Sri Ganganagar district of Rajasthan and is in the close proximity of Radcliffe Line demarcated between India and Pakistan. Suratgarh is also famous for its Air Force Base Station which provides a strategic advantage to India over neighboring Pakistan. It was chosen for the shooting the first schedule of the film because of its resemblance with the village of Punjab in undivided India back in 1921 where Joginder Singh lived his childhood and adolescence until he joined the British Indian Army.

Dras, a beauteous town on National Highway 1D or popularly known as Srinagar-Leh Highway came into prominence owing to Pakistani incursions in the Kargil sector in the summer of 1999, but it is also the second coldest inhabited place in the world. The second schedule is going on in the treacherous terrain of Dras and will be wrapped up by the end of October 2017.

Soundtrack

References

External links 
 

2018 war drama films
Punjabi-language Indian films
Films set in 1962
Indian war drama films
Indian epic films
Films set in Jammu and Kashmir
Films about terrorism in India
Sino-Indian War films
Films about revolutions
2018 films
Indian Army in films
War adventure films
Biographical action films
Indian historical action films
Films directed by Simerjit Singh
2018 drama films
2010s Punjabi-language films
Films scored by Jassi Katyal
Films scored by Jaidev Kumar
Films scored by Gurmeet Singh